Ian Fleming (born Ian Macfarlane; 10 September 1888 – 1 January 1969) was an Australian character actor with credits in over 100 British films. One of his best known roles was playing Dr Watson in a series of Sherlock Holmes films of the 1930s opposite Arthur Wontner's Holmes.

Fleming also played a number of supporting roles in many classic British films of the era, including Q Planes (1939), Night Train to Munich (1940), We Dive at Dawn, The Life and Death of Colonel Blimp (both 1943) and Waterloo Road (1945). He also appeared regularly in the films of musical comedian George Formby. He also acted on stage, appearing as Robert Harley in the Norman Ginsbury's historical work Viceroy Sarah in the West End.

Fleming's later career included appearances in many television series of the 1950s and 1960s, such as Fabian of the Yard, Hancock's Half Hour, Educated Evans, Dixon of Dock Green, Dr. Finlay's Casebook, The Forsyte Saga and The Prisoner.

Partial filmography

 Second to None (1927)
 The Ware Case (1928)
 The Devil's Maze (1929)
 The School for Scandal (1930)
 The Sleeping Cardinal (1931)
 The Missing Rembrandt (1932) 
 Lucky Girl (1932)
 Called Back (1933)
 After Dark (1933)
 The Third Clue (1934)
 School for Stars (1935)
 The Triumph of Sherlock Holmes (1935)
 Sexton Blake and the Mademoiselle (1935)
 The Riverside Murder (1935)
 The Crouching Beast (1935)
 Prison Breaker (1936)
 Excuse My Glove (1936)
 Jump for Glory (1937)
 Racing Romance (1937)
 Darby and Joan (1937)
 Silver Blaze (1937), known in America as Murder at the Baskervilles
 Dial 999 (1938)
 Double or Quits (1938)
 The Nursemaid Who Disappeared (1939)
 The Good Old Days (1939) (lost)
 The Lion Has Wings (1939)
 Men Without Honour (1939)
 Q Planes (1939)
 Three Silent Men (1940)
 It Happened to One Man (1940)
 Jeannie (1941)
 They Flew Alone (1942)
 Let the People Sing (1942)
 I Didn't Do It (1945)
 They Knew Mr. Knight (1946)
 George in Civvy Street (1946)
 Appointment with Crime (1946)
 Hammer the Toff (1952)
 Wings of Danger (1952)
 The Voice of Merrill (1952)
 Black Orchid (1953)
 Park Plaza 605 (1953)
 Eight O'Clock Walk (1954)
 The Embezzler (1954)
 High Flight (1957)
 Innocent Meeting (1958)
 Your Money or Your Wife (1960)
 Bluebeard's Ten Honeymoons (1960)
 Return of a Stranger (1961)
 The Lamp in Assassin Mews (1962)
 Richard the Lionheart (1962)
 The Forsyte Saga (TV serial, 1967) : Lord Fontenoy

Selected stage appearances
 The Berg by Ernest Raymond (1929)
 Viceroy Sarah by Norman Ginsbury (1935)
 The Blue Goose by Peter Blackmore (1941)
 His Excellency by Campbell Christie (1950)

References

External links

1888 births
1969 deaths
Australian male film actors
Male actors from Melbourne
Australian expatriate male actors in the United Kingdom